Brave Tank Hero is a tank action video game for the Nintendo 3DS and Wii U developed by Arc System Works and published by Natsume. The game was first released for the Nintendo 3DS on August 11, 2015; and a Wii U release followed a few weeks later. The story of Brave Tank Hero revolves around a place called Paradise City that has been invaded by the Shadow Tank forces and it's up to the player, a low-ranking soldier, to take it back from them. Missions start up slowly as they introduce the player to the gameplay and gimmicks; there are a total of 50, and they make up the bulk of the gameplay. Players can also upgrade their tank and unlock other tanks. Reviews were largely negative, citing bland, meaningless, and frustrating gameplay. However, reviewers did express that there was some entertainment value in the games local multiplayer.

References

2015 video games
Action video games
Arc System Works games
Multiplayer and single-player video games
Natsume (company) games
Nintendo 3DS games
Tank simulation video games
Video games developed in Japan
Wii U games